The Tejano Run Stakes is an American ungraded Thoroughbred horse race held annually at Turfway Park in Florence, Kentucky. Open to horses age four and older, it is contested on Polytrack synthetic dirt over a distance of one and one eighth miles (8 furlongs).

Inaugurated in 1974 as the Pioneer Stakes, the race was renamed in 1997 to honor Tejano Run who won the 1996 Pioneer Stakes as well as other important stakes at Turfway Park.

There was no race run in 1990 and 2009.

Distances:
 1 mile : 1983-1988
  miles : 1974–1982, 1989–present

Records
Speed record: (at current distance of  miles) 
 1:45.00 - London Fog (1978) & Savage Moon (1979)

Most wins
 2 - Tribute to Royalty (1986, 1988)
 2 - Danville (1995, 1998)
 2 - Glacial (1999, 2001)

Most wins by a jockey
 3 - Michael McDowell (1979, 1986, 1988)
 3 - James Bruin (1987, 1992, 1994)

Most wins by a trainer
 3 - Bernard S. Flint (2002, 2004, 2005)

Most wins by an owner
 2 - John E. Churchman, Jr. (1986, 1988)
 2 - Top of the Key Stable (1995, 1998)
 2 - Kingfish Stable (1999, 2001)
 2 - LTB Inc. & R. A. Williams (2004, 2005)

Winners

References
 History of the Tejano Run Stakes at Turfway Park

Ungraded stakes races in the United States
Flat horse races for four-year-olds
Open mile category horse races
Turfway Park horse races
Recurring sporting events established in 1974
1974 establishments in Kentucky